Narmiq may refer to:
 Narmiq, Sarab
 Narmiq, Mehraban, Sarab County